Annie Ros (5 March 1926 – 14 June 2013) was a Dutch gymnast. She competed at the 1948 Summer Olympics and the 1952 Summer Olympics.

References

1926 births
2013 deaths
Dutch female artistic gymnasts
Olympic gymnasts of the Netherlands
Gymnasts at the 1948 Summer Olympics
Gymnasts at the 1952 Summer Olympics
Sportspeople from Utrecht (city)